Great Balls of Fire is the twenty-first solo studio album by American singer-songwriter Dolly Parton. It was released on May 28, 1979, by RCA Victor. The album was produced by Dean Parks and Gregg Perry with Parton and Charles Koppelman serving as executive producers. The album peaked at number four on the Billboard Top Country Albums chart and number 40 on the Billboard 200. Two of the album's four singles charted in the top ten of the Billboard Hot Country Songs chart. "You're the Only One" topped the chart, while "Sweet Summer Lovin'" peaked at number seven. The album has been certified Gold in the United States.

Content
The album includes four Parton compositions. There are two notable covers on the album: Great Balls of Fire, the Jerry Lee Lewis hit from 1957; and a bluegrass-inspired recording of The Beatles hit "Help!".

Release and promotion
The album was released May 28, 1979 on LP, 8-track, and cassette.

Singles
The album's first single, "You're the Only One", was released in May 1979. It peaked at number one on the Billboard Hot Country Songs chart, Parton's eleventh song to do so. It also peaked at number 14 on the Billboard Adult Contemporary chart, and number 59 on the Billboard Hot 100. The song was also a hit in Canada, peaking at number one on both the RPM Country Singles chart and the RPM Adult Contemporary chart. It peaked at number 63 on the RPM Top Singles chart. The single peaked at number 33 in Australia on the Kent Music Report.

The second and third singles, "Great Balls of Fire" and "Sweet Summer Lovin'", were released as a double A-side in August 1979. "Great Balls of Fire" was aimed at pop radio and failed to chart on its own. Its only chart appearance was on the Billboard Hot Country Songs chart, where it charted as the flip-side of "Sweet Summer Lovin". "Sweet Summer Lovin'" was released to country radio and was Parton's eleventh song to top the Billboard Hot Country Songs chart. It also peaked at number 47 on the Billboard Adult Contemporary chart and number 77 on the Billboard Hot 100. "Sweet Summer Lovin'" was also a hit in Canada, peaking at number six on the RPM Country Singles chart and number eight on the RPM Adult Contemporary chart.

The fourth single, "Star of the Show", was released in December 1979 in Australia, New Zealand, and the Netherlands. It peaked at number 99 in Australia on the Kent Music Report.

Critical reception

The album received a positive review from Billboard, which said that "Parton has now firmly established herself in the pop field and reinforces her universal appeal with a collection of songs that showcase her versatility." They added that Parton's "sweet vocals" were aided by "a conglomeration of stellar players" that give the music a "needed punch." The review named "You're the Only One", "Help!", "Star of the Show", and "Do You Think That Time Stands Still" as the best cuts on the album and noted that the album's "attractive packag[ing] is a sales stimulant."

Cashbox also gave a positive review of the album, saying that "Dolly proves how evocative she is on her latest RCA release." The review went on to say that Parton "lends her feathery voice to some thought-provoking love ballads, good time country numbers, streamlined rockers, and even throws in a dancin' number." The review concluded by saying that the "countrified version" of "Help!" and "knockout ballad" "Do You Think That Time Stands Still" are the standout cuts on the album.

Writing for AllMusic, Mark Deming gave the album three and a half out of five stars. He felt that "considering how well (and how sympathetically) Parton produced herself on her last few pre-crossover efforts...Dean Parks and Gregg Perry's studio settings [are] a bit disconcerting," but "they thankfully seem aware at all times who is in the spotlight, and Dolly, professional that she is, rises to the challenge on all ten tracks." He also noted that there are only four Parton compositions on the album and said that  "it seems ironic that the most purely country cut on the LP is a cover of the Beatles' "Help!," which is given a sprightly neo-bluegrass arrangement."

Commercial performance
The album debuted at number 19 on the Billboard Top Country Albums chart dated June 23, 1979. It would peak at number four on the chart dated July 28, where it would remain for five non-consecutive weeks. The album charted for a total of 26 weeks. It also peaked at number 40 on the Billboard 200. In Canada, the album peaked at number one on the RPM Country Albums chart and number 28 on the Top Albums chart. The album also peaked at number 48 in Australia on the Kent Music Report.

The album was certified Gold by the Recording Industry Association of America on November 13, 1979.

Reissues
The album was reissued on CD for the first time in February 2007, paired with her 1980 album Dolly, Dolly, Dolly. It was made available as a digital download in March 2007.

Track listing

Charts

Weekly charts

Year-end charts

Personnel
Adapted from the album liner notes.

Performance
Anita Ball – backing vocals ("Star of the Show", "Do You Think That Time Stands Still" and "It's Not My Affair Anymore")
Lenny Castro – conga
Quitman Dennis – horns
Richard Dennison – backing vocals ("Star of the Show", "Do You Think That Time Stands Still" and "It's Not My Affair Anymore")
Earle Dumler – English horn
Chuck Findley – horns
David Foster – keyboards ("Star of the Show" and "Almost in Love")
Roy Galloway – background vocals ("Star of the Show" and "Down")
David Grisman – mandolin
Gary Herbig – horns
Jim Horn – horns
Jim Keltner – drums, percussion
Abraham Laboriel – bass
Joe McGuffee – steel guitar
Michael Omartian – keyboards ("You're the Only One", "Do You Think That Time Stands Still" and "It's Not My Affair Anymore")
Carol Carmichael Parks – backing vocals ("You're the Only One", "Sweet Summer Lovin'", "Almost in Love" and "It's Not My Affair Anymore")
Dean Parks – guitars, alto flute, synthesizer
Dolly Parton – lead vocals
Bill Payne – keyboards ("Down", "Help!", "Great Balls of Fire" and "Sandy's Song")
Herb Pedersen – banjo, backing vocals ("Help!)
Gregg Perry – piano ("Star of the Show" and "Almost in Love"), synthesizer
Dorothy Remsen – harp
Ricky Skaggs – backing vocals ("Help!)
Stephanie Spruill – tambourine, backing vocals ("Star of the Show" and "Down")
Julia Waters – backing vocals ("Star of the Show" and "Down")
Maxine Waters – backing vocals ("Star of the Show" and "Down")

Production
Harry Bluestone – concertmaster
Frank DeCaro – contractor
Linda Gerrity – production coordinator
Bernie Grundmann – mastering engineer
Jim Horn – horn arrangements
Charles Koppelman – executive producer
Dean Parks – producer, rhythm arrangements, string arrangements ("Almost in Love"), horn arrangements
Dolly Parton – executive producer
Gregg Perry – producer, string arrangements ("You're the Only One", "Do You Think That Time Stands Still" and "Sandy's Song"), horn arrangements
Eric Prestidge – engineer
Sid Sharp – concertmaster
Linda Tyler – recording assistant (Sound Labs, Inc.)

Other personnel
Nancy Atkins – A&R coordination
Ed Caraeff – art direction, photography, album design

References

1979 albums
Dolly Parton albums
RCA Records albums
Albums produced by Gary Klein (producer)